Okram Bikram Singh (born ) is an Indian male  track cyclist. He competed in the team sprint event at the 2012 and 2013 UCI Track Cycling World Championships.

References

External links
 Profile at cyclingarchives.com

1985 births
Living people
Indian track cyclists
Indian male cyclists
Place of birth missing (living people)
Cyclists at the 2010 Commonwealth Games
Cyclists at the 2010 Asian Games
Asian Games competitors for India
Commonwealth Games competitors for India